Brunswick Town Hall is located on the corner of Sydney Road and Dawson Street in the inner northern Melbourne suburb of Brunswick, Victoria, Australia.

History
Brunswick was declared a municipality in 1857, after residents petitioned for municipal government. The first municipal chambers were erected in 1859 on Sydney Road at Lobb's Hill, between Stewart and Albion Streets. The present Town Hall is an imposing Victorian building in the Second Empire style, built in 1876. In 1908 Brunswick became a city.

Diagonally opposite from the Town Hall is the Mechanics' Institute, built in 1868, and used for education and social activities. A monument to the Free Speech fights of the 1930s stands near the corner. The building was acquired by the Brunswick City Council in 1927 and for many years served as the Brunswick Municipal Library.

During 1973 the Brunswick City Council embarked on a plan to demolish the Town Hall and build a modern five story building to house all of council services. The Brunswick Progress Association led a successful public campaign in 1974 against council, to stop the demolition of the town hall.

After the amalgamation of the City of Brunswick with the City of Coburg and the southern portion of the City of Broadmeadows in 1994 to form the City of Moreland, the Town Hall now functions as secondary offices for the new Moreland City Council.

The Brunswick Town Hall and Atrium is available for hire, and is a venue for the Brunswick Music Festival. The Town Hall building contains the Counihan Gallery and the Brunswick branch of the Moreland City Library.

See also
 List of Town Halls in Melbourne

References
 It happened in Brunswick 1837-1987 by Les Barnes. Published Brunswick Community History Group
 Moreland City Council Official Website

External links

 https://web.archive.org/web/20070831011827/http://www.moreland.vic.gov.au/services/brunswicktownhall.htm

Town halls in Melbourne
1876 establishments in Australia
Government buildings completed in 1876
Buildings and structures in the City of Merri-bek